Funny Money is a 2006 American comedy film directed by Leslie Greif and starring Chevy Chase, Penelope Ann Miller and Armand Assante. It is based on the 1996 British play Funny Money by Ray Cooney. It was a co-production between Germany, the United States and Romania.

Synopsis
Its plot concerns a couple who accidentally find themselves in possession of a briefcase containing $5 million belonging to the Romanian Mafia.

Cast
 Chevy Chase as Henry Perkins
 Penelope Ann Miller as Carol Perkins
 Armand Assante as Genero
 Christopher McDonald as Vic
 Robert Loggia as Feldman
 Guy Torry as Angel
 Rebecca Wisocky as MM. Virginia
 Kevin Sussman as Denis Slater
 Alex Meneses as Gina
 Marty Belafsky as Stan Martin

References

External links

2006 films
German comedy films
Romanian comedy films
English-language German films
English-language Romanian films
2006 comedy films
Films based on works by Ray Cooney
2000s English-language films
American comedy films
2000s American films
2000s German films